Anarchapulco is an annual anarcho-capitalist and voluntaryist conference held in Acapulco, Mexico. It was founded by Canadian-Dominican activist and entrepreneur Jeff Berwick in 2015. The term is a blend-in portmanteau of Anarchy, its based society, and Acapulco, the city, hence the name.

The conference attracted increased attention and controversy after a member of the community, a fugitive from American drug charges, Shane Cress, using the pseudonym John Galton, was shot and killed at his home in Acapulco.

References 

Anarcho-capitalism
Festivals in Mexico
Right-libertarianism
Voluntaryism